Club Esportiu Premià is a Spanish football team based in Premià de Mar, in the autonomous community of Catalonia. Founded in 1915, it plays in Segona Catalana, holding home matches at Estadio Municipal de Premià, with a capacity of 1,500 spectators.

Season to season

4 seasons in Segunda División B
13 seasons in Tercera División

Famous players
 Claudiu Răducanu
 Mariano Diaz Mejia
 Aday Benitez
 Enric Gallego
 Bambo Diaby

External links
Official website  
Futbolme team profile 

Football clubs in Catalonia
Association football clubs established in 1915
Divisiones Regionales de Fútbol clubs
1915 establishments in Spain